Jon Dooley (29 April 1946 – 2 September 2020) was a British auto racing driver. He finished third overall in the British Touring Car Championship on three occasions, in 1981, 1984 and 1987 competing in cars from the Alfa Romeo marque. He competed in the BSCC/BTCC from 1976 to 1989, all but one race in an Alfa Romeo.

Racing record

Complete British Saloon / Touring Car Championship results
(key) (Races in bold indicate pole position) (Races in italics indicate fastest lap – 1 point awarded ?–1989 in class)

† Events with 2 races staged for the different classes.

References

External links

1946 births
2020 deaths
British Touring Car Championship drivers